Desulfocella  is a Gram-negative, anaerobic and non-spore-forming bacteria genus from the family of Desulfobacteraceae with one known species (Desulfocella halophila).

References

Further reading 
 

Desulfobacterales
Bacteria genera
Monotypic bacteria genera